The Government of Mohammad-Javad Bahonar was the second government of Iran after the Iranian Revolution. During that time, Mohammad-Ali Rajai was president and Mohammad-Javad Bahonar was prime minister.

Rajai's Presidency
On August 15, 1981, Rajai was elected as second president of Iran. He introduced Mohammad-Javad Bahonar as prime minister to parliament and parliament voted him. Rajai was the President of Iran for 15 days. He started the Iranian retirement program for individuals over the age of 70.
On August 30, 1981, President Rajai held a meeting of Iran's Supreme Defense Council, along with Prime Minister Mohammad Javad Bahonar.  Witnesses later stated that a trusted aide brought a briefcase into the conference room, setting it between the two leaders, then left.  Another person opened the case, triggering a bomb that set the room ablaze and killed Rajai, Bahonar, and three others.  The assassin was identified as Masoud Keshmiri, an operative of the People's Mujahedin of Iran.

Bahonar's Prime Ministership
When Rajai became President on August 4, 1981, he chose Bahonar as his prime minister.

After Mohammad Beheshti was assassinated on June 28, 1981, Bahonar became the secretary-general of the Islamic Republic party, but he didn't last long in that position, nor in the position of Prime Minister, as he was assassinated after less than two months in these offices, along with Rajai and other party leaders, when a bomb exploded at his office in Tehran.

Members of the cabinet
List of members of Bahonar's cabinet was as follows:

See also

Cabinet of Iran

References

1981 establishments in Iran 
1981 disestablishments in Iran
Iran
Iran
Bahonar